ASC Agouado is a French Guianese football team based in Apatou that plays in the French Guiana Championnat National.

Honors 
 French Guiana Championnat
 Winners (1): 2018–19

References

Football clubs in French Guiana